Borgelt is a surname. Notable people with the surname include:

Marion Borgelt (born 1954), Australian artist 
Peter Borgelt (1927–1994), German actor